Kafa Coh is a Ugandan English language legal drama directed by Gilbert K. Lukalia, produced by Doreen Mirembe at her Amani House Productions in Kampala and stars Nigerian actor Kalu Ikeagwu, Doreen Mirembe, singer, producer and actor Mariam Ndagire, Abby Mukiibi Nkaaga, Rehema Nanfuka, Vladimir Stefanov and Oyenbot. It premiered in Kampala on October 8th 2022 and showed in cinema up to October 13th of the same year.

Plot
The film is set in a fictional African country of Tangosi, where a young lawyer, Sandrah Atika Alexis finds herself in the middle of bloody conflict between two political heavyweights. She faces barriers in her fight for justice in a very corrupt political scene in the country of Tangosi.

Casting and Production
The film cast mostly Uganda's most popular actors, with a guest lead actor Kalu Ikeagwu from Nigerian and Vladimir Stefanov. Production for the film started in 2018 under Doreen Mirembe's own production company, Amani House Productions. The film had been set for release in 2020 but the COVID-19 Pandemic and associated lockdowns caused a postponement. In February 2022, it was announced that it would be released on October 10th 2022 in Kampala.

Cast & Characters

References

External Links
 

Ugandan drama films
Legal drama films